Estradiol/medroxyprogesterone acetate (E2/MPA), sold under the brand names Indivina and Tridestra among others, is a combination product of estradiol, an estrogen, and medroxyprogesterone acetate, a progestogen, which is used in menopausal hormone therapy for the treatment of menopausal symptoms. It is taken by mouth.

See also
 Conjugated estrogens/medroxyprogesterone acetate
 Estradiol cypionate/medroxyprogesterone acetate
 List of combined sex-hormonal preparations

Notes and references

Combined estrogen–progestogen formulations